Rostislav Martynek (born October 10, 1982) is a Czech professional ice hockey player. He played with HC České Budějovice in the Czech Extraliga during the 2010–11 Czech Extraliga season.

Martynek played previously for HC Oceláři Třinec.

References

External links

1982 births
Living people
Motor České Budějovice players
Czech ice hockey forwards
HC Oceláři Třinec players
Sportspeople from Třinec
HC Frýdek-Místek players
HC Litvínov players
Czech expatriate ice hockey players in Germany